The Hungary national football team represents Hungary in men's international football and is controlled by the Hungarian Football Federation. The team has made 9 appearances in the FIFA World Cup and 4 appearances in the European Championship, and plays its home matches at the Puskás Aréna, which opened in November 2019.

Hungary has a respectable football history, having won 3 Olympic titles, finishing runners-up in the 1938 and 1954 World Cups, and third in the 1964 UEFA European Football Championship. Hungary revolutionized the sport in the 1950s, laying the tactical fundamentals of Total Football and dominating international football with the remarkable Golden Team which included legend Ferenc Puskás, one of the top goalscorers of the 20th century, to whom FIFA dedicated the Puskás Award, given annually to the player who scored the "most beautiful" goal of the calendar year. The side of that era has the all-time highest Football Elo Ranking in the world, with 2230 in 1954, and one of the longest undefeated runs in football history, remaining unbeaten in 31 games, spanning over four years including the much heralded Match of the Century.

The Hungarian team faced a severe drought starting from their elimination at the 1986 World Cup, failing to qualify for a major tournament for 30 years and reaching their lowest FIFA ranking (87) in 1996, as well as finishing 6th in their group of the Euro 2008 qualifiers, before qualifying to back-to-back Euros in 2016 and 2020, as well as getting promotion to the 2022–23 UEFA Nations League A.

History

Although Austria and Hungary were constituent countries of the dual monarchy known as the Austro-Hungarian Empire, they formed separate football associations and teams around the start of the 20th century.

Early years

1910s

The national side first appeared at the Summer Olympic Games in 1912 in Stockholm, Sweden. The team had to ask for donations in order to be able to go to the games. Hungary lost 7–0 to England and thus were eliminated.
After the Olympic Games Hungary played two matches against Russia in Moscow. The first match was won 9–0 and the second 12–0, which is still a record for the national side. The top scorer of the two matches was Imre Schlosser who scored seven goals. The beginning of World War I had a deep impact on the thriving Hungarian football. Both the country and the clubs were suffering financial problems. During World War I Hungary played Austria 16 times. In 1919 England claimed the exclusion of the Central Powers (including Hungary) from FIFA. When FIFA refused England's plea, the British (English, Scottish, Welsh, and Irish) associations decided to resign from FIFA.

1920s

Budapest was denied the opportunity to host the 1920 Summer Olympics, which were held in Belgium. The countries of the Central Powers (Germany, Austria-Hungary, Ottoman Empire and Bulgaria) were excluded from the Olympics. The formation the Hungarians used was 2–3–5 which was unique at that time.

During this period the Fogl brothers (József and Károly Fogl) played in the national team. Between 1921 and 1924, Béla Guttmann also played six times for the team. At the 1924 Summer Olympic Games in Paris, Guttmann objected to the fact that there were more officials than players in the Hungary squad and that the hotel was more suitable for socialising than match preparation, and to demonstrate his disapproval he hung dead rats on the doors of the travelling officials. At the 1924 Summer Olympics, in the first match Hungary beat Poland but in the second round they lost to Egypt. As a consequence, both the head coach and the head of the Hungarian Football Federation resigned.

Between 1927 and 1930, Hungary participated in the Central European International Cup  which is considered to be the first international tournament, with Austria, Czechoslovakia, Italy and Switzerland. In the final, Hungary lost to Italy 0–5. On 12 June 1927, Hungary beat France by 13–1, which is still a record. József Takács scored six goals.

Golden Era

1930s

The first FIFA World Cup was held in Uruguay in 1930, but Hungary were not invited and did not take part in the tournament; there were no qualification matches. Hungary first appeared in the 1934 World Cup in Italy. Hungary's first World Cup match was against Egypt on 27 May 1934, a 4–2 win. The goals were scored by Pál Teleki, Géza Toldi (2) and Jenő Vincze. In the quarter-finals, Hungary faced neighbouring arch-rivals Austria but lost 2–1, the only Hungarian goal coming from György Sárosi.

Hungary entered the 1936 Olympics, where in the first round they were eliminated by Poland, 0–3.

The 1938 World Cup was held in France. The first match was played against Dutch East Indies and Hungary won 6–0. Sárosi and Gyula Zsengellér each scored twice while Vilmos Kohut and Toldi scored one goal each. In the quarter-finals, Hungary beat Switzerland 2–0 with goals by Sárosi and Zsengellér. In the semi-final at the Parc des Princes, Paris, Hungary beat Sweden 5–1 with goals by Ferenc Sas and Sárosi and a hat-trick by Zsengellér. In the final, Hungary faced Italy at the Stade Olympique de Colombes, Paris, but lost 4–2. The Hungarian goals were scored by Pál Titkos and Sárosi.

1950s

This Hungarian team was best known as one of the most formidable and influential sides in football history, which revolutionised the play of the game. Centred around the dynamic and potent quartet of strikers Ferenc Puskás, Sándor Kocsis, attacking half-back József Bozsik and second striker Nándor Hidegkuti, the Aranycsapat ("Golden Team") of the "Magnificent Magyars" captivated the football world with an exciting brand of play with innovative tactical nuances. Excluding the 1954 World Cup Final, they achieved a remarkable record of 43 victories, 6 draws, and 0 defeats from 14 May 1950 until they lost 3–1 to Turkey on 19 February 1956.
In the 1952 Summer Olympics in Helsinki, Hungary beat Romania 2–1 with a goal each from Czibor and Kocsis in the preliminary round. In the first round Hungary beat Italy 3–0; in the quarter-finals Hungary beat Turkey 7–1; and in the semi-finals Hungary faced Sweden, the 1948 Olympics champions and won 6–0. In the final, Hungary beat Yugoslavia 2–0 with a goal each from Puskás and Czibor and thus won the Olympic title for the first time.

On 25 November 1953, England played Hungary at Wembley Stadium, London in a match later dubbed as the "match of the century". The English team were unbeaten for 90 years at home. In front of 105,000 spectators Nándor Hidegkuti scored the first Hungarian goal in the first minute. At half-time the score was 4–2 to Hungary. The Hungarian goals were scored by Nándor Hidegkúti (1st, 22nd) and Ferenc Puskás (25th, 29th). In the second half the Hungarians scored twice more (Hidegkúti and József Bozsik). The final score was 6–3.

On 23 May 1954, the Hungarian national team beat England 7–1 (which remains their worst defeat to date) at the Puskás Ferenc Stadium. At that time in Hungary there was a saying about the match: Az angolok egy hétre jöttek és 7:1-re mentek, which is a double play on words. The word "week" in Hungarian is called "hét", meaning the number seven. The English came for 1:7 and left with 7:1.

The 1954 World Cup was held in Switzerland. The first match was played against South Korea and Hungary won by 9–0 at the Hardturm, Zürich. In the second group match, Hungary played against West Germany and won by 8–3 at St. Jakob Stadium, Basel. In the quarter-finals, Hungary beat Brazil 4–2 at the Wankdorf Stadium, Bern. In the semi-finals, Hungary played with the two-times World Cup winner Uruguay in Lausanne; Hungary won by 4–2 after extra time. In the final, Hungary faced with West Germany again. Although Hungary won the group match against the Germans, they lost 3–2 in the final in Bern at the Wankdorf Stadium. The Golden Team, built around the legendary Ferenc Puskás, led early 2–0, but ended up 2–3 in a game the West Germans subsequently christened "The Miracle of Bern".

In 2010, journalist Erik Eggers speculates in a study that the German team may have used drugs to beat the Hungarian team, who were considered "invincible" at that time.

Although Hungary qualified as the defending champions for the 1956 Olympics, they did not enter the tournament.

Hungary qualified for the 1958 World Cup in Sweden. Hungary played their first match against Wales at the Jarnvallen stadium in Sandviken and the final result was 1–1. The second group match was played against the host country, Sweden, where Hungary lost 2–1 at the Råsunda Stadium, Solna. Although Hungary won their last group match against Mexico at the Jarnvallen stadium in Sandvinken, they were eliminated from the World Cup after losing a play-off to Wales, who they had drawn level with on points. The Welsh had drawn all their group matches and then beat the once-mighty Hungarians in a play-off match to decide which nation should follow Sweden into the knock-out stage. Had goal difference been the decider, Hungary would have gone through, as the Hungarians had a goal tally of 6–3 compared to 2–2 for Wales. As it was, Wales instead met Brazil in the quarter-finals and were the recipient of young Pelé's first World Cup goal.

1960s

In 1960, Hungary again entered the Olympics held in Italy and was drawn into Group D with France, Peru and India. Hungary finished top of the group with all wins and a goal difference of +12. In the semi-finals, they lost to Denmark 0–2, but beat Italy in the bronze medal match 2–1 thanks to a goal each from Orosz and Dunai.

Hungary qualified for the 1962 World Cup, held in Chile. On 31 May 1962, in the first group match, Hungary beat England by 2–1 thanks to the goals of Lajos Tichy and Flórián Albert at El Teniente stadium in Rancagua in front of 7,938 spectators. The second match on 3 June 1962 was even more convincing against Bulgaria; the match was won 6–1 in Rancagua. The last group match was against Argentina on 6 June 1962 and the final result was a goalless draw in front of 7,945 spectators in Rancagua. Hungary qualified for the quarter-finals by gaining five points and winning the group. In the quarter-finals, however, Hungary was eliminated by Czechoslovakia by 1–0 at El Teniente in front of 11,690 spectators.

In 1964, Hungary again qualified for the 1964 Olympics held in Tokyo and was drawn into Group B with defending champions Yugoslavia, Morocco and North Korea, the latter withdrawing. In their first match against Morocco, Hungary won 6–0 with all six goals scored by Ferenc Bene. In their second match, Hungary won narrowly (6–5) against Yugoslavia and advanced into the next round along with runners-up Yugoslavia. In the quarter-finals, Hungary beat Romania 2–0 with goals from Csernai. In the semi-finals, Hungary beat United Arab Republic (Egypt) 6–0 with four goals from Bene and two from Komora. In the finals, Hungary beat Czechoslovakia 2–1 thanks from an own goal by Weiss and a goal by Bene, thus won their second gold medal.

Hungary qualified for the 1964 European Nations' Cup which was organised in Spain. Hungary played against Spain in the semi-finals of the tournament. The final result was 2–1 after extra time. The only Hungarian goal was scored by Ferenc Bene. In the third place play-off Hungary beat Denmark 3–1 after extra time. Dezső Novák scored twice in the extra time.

Hungary also managed to qualify for the 1966 World Cup which was held in the home of football, England. On 13 July 1966, Hungary lost their first group match against Eusébio's Portugal (3–1) at Old Trafford, Manchester. Two days later, in the second group match Hungary beat Brazil thanks to the goals of Ferenc Bene, János Farkas and Kálmán Mészöly at Goodison Park, Liverpool. In the last round of the group matches, on 20 July 1966, Hungary beat Bulgaria 3–1. The goals were scored by Mészöly and Bene. Hungary finished second in the group and qualified for the quarter-finals. In the quarter-finals, Hungary were eliminated by the Soviet Union on 23 July 1966 by 2–1 at the Roker Park in Sunderland in front of 26,844 spectators.

In 1968 Olympics, Hungary qualified as defending champions to defend their title and was drawn into Group C with Israel, Ghana and El Salvador. Hungary finished top and advanced into the next round with Israel. In the quarter-finals, Hungary beat Guatemala narrowly with 1–0 from a goal by Szűcs. In the semi-finals, they beat Japan 5–0 thanks to Szűcs with three goals and two from Novák. In the finals, they beat Bulgaria 4–1 and won their third title, being the most successful team at the Olympics in football (Great Britain also won three titles but their first title is in 1904, and football only became an official event in 1908). However, Hungary failed to qualify for the 1970 FIFA World Cup, following a severe defeat to Czechoslovakia (1–4) during a qualification play-off, which many see as the beginning of a period of long-standing decline.

Flórián Albert was named European Footballer of the Year in 1967. He was the most successful footballer of Ferencváros since the formation of the club, scoring 255 goals in 351 matches from 1958 to 1974.

Slow regression

1970s

Hungary came back again as long-time defending champions in the 1972 Olympics in Munich and was drawn into Group C with Denmark, Iran and Brazil. They finished top and advanced into the next round with Denmark. In their second group round, they were drawn into Group 1 with East Germany, West Germany and Mexico. They again finished top undefeated and advanced into the finals with East Germany. In the finals, they faced Poland and lost 1–2. The only Hungarian goal was scored by Varady.

Hungary qualified for the finals of the UEFA Euro 1972 which was held in Belgium. In the semi-finals, Hungary faced the Soviet Union and lost 1–0. In the third place play-off, Hungary lost to Belgium 2–1. The only Hungarian goal was scored by Lajos Kű. Hungary finished fourth in at the Euro. The Hungarians would not appear at the European Championship again for 44 years until UEFA Euro 2016.

Hungary participated in the 1978 World Cup which was held in Argentina. On 2 June 1978 at the Estadio Monumental in Buenos Aires, Hungary played with Argentina. Although Károly Csapó scored an early goal, the home side won the match by 2–1. Hungary played their second group match against Italy and the Azzurri won by 3–1. Hungary's third match was played against Michel Platini's France and Hungary lost 3–1 which resulted the farewell of the national side.

1980s

During the 1980s, Hungary qualified for the World Cup twice. The first group match of the 1982 tournament in Spain was played against El Salvador, where Hungary won 10–1 at Estadio Nuevo, Elche. The goals were scored by Tibor Nyilasi (2), Gábor Pölöskei, László Fazekas (2), József Tóth, László Kiss (3) and Lázár Szentes. In spite of the big victory, Hungary lost to 4–1 to Diego Maradona's Argentina in the second match of the group stages. Maradona scored twice, while the only Hungarian goal was scored by Pölöskei at the Estadio José Rico Pérez in Alicante. Although Hungary drew in the last match against Belgium, they were eliminated from the World Cup. Hungary, however, had been leading in the first half thanks to a goal by József Varga.

Hungary's last World Cup appearance to date was the 1986 World Cup in Mexico. In the first match of the group Hungary lost 6–0 to the Soviet Union. Football experts date the crisis of the Hungarian football from this match. Although Hungary won their second match against Canada 2–0 (the goals were scored by Márton Esterházy and Lajos Détári), they lost to Michel Platini's France 3–0 in the last group match.

Era of decline

1990s
During the 1990s, Hungary were not able to qualify for any international tournaments save for the 1996 Summer Olympics held in Atlanta. The 1980s were considered as the most bitter years of Hungarian football until then, but the 1990s proved to be the worst. In 1996, Hungary reached its lowest FIFA World Ranking, 87th. The fall of the Hungarian Communist regime caused financial problems to many Hungarian clubs. Formerly successful clubs like Ferencváros and Újpest faced financial crisis and bankruptcy. This had a profound effect on the Hungarian national team as well since earlier the biggest clubs from Budapest (Ferencváros, Újpest, Honvéd and MTK) produced the players for the national side. Another important reason for the decline can be attributed to the Bosman ruling. Since the Hungarian clubs lost the financial aid from the state in the early 1990s, they were not able to compete with the richer Western European clubs. The crisis in the Hungarian club football affected the performance of the national team.

Hungarian legend Ferenc Puskás was appointed as the head coach of the national side in 1993 in order to bring back earlier success. He led the team for only four matches, however, as the former Honvéd and Real Madrid star failed to make an impact. The only remarkable success in the 1990s was the qualification of Hungary to the 1996 Summer Olympics. Antal Dunai's team played its first group match against Nigeria and lost to 1–0 in Orlando. In the second group match, Hungary played Brazil and lost to 3–1. The only Hungarian goal was scored by Csaba Madar. The last group match was played against Japan, a 3–2 loss. The Hungarian goals were scored by Csaba Madar and Tamás Sándor. Although the Olympic qualification of the young team was a big surprise and people thought that Hungary would re-emerge on the international football scene, the team never reached any similar success later. In the 1990s, Hungary were the closest to qualify for the 1998 World Cup but were eliminated in the play-offs by Yugoslavia with a 12–1 aggregate score.

2000s
Hungary were unable to qualify for any major tournament, missing out UEFA Euro 2000, 2004, 2008 and the 2002, 2006 and 2010 FIFA World Cups. Moreover, during the Euro 2008 qualification, Hungary finished sixth in their group, reaching their nadir in their football history. They even lost to minnows Malta which resulted in the resignation of Péter Bozsik. Several days later, Péter Várhidi was appointed who was famous for his appearances in the Sport 1, Hungarian sport television, and analyzing the Italian Serie A clubs. He proved his talent by beating the 2006 World Champions Italy 3–1 at the Ferenc Puskás Stadium in a friendly tie. Neither Bozsik nor Várhidi, however, could do well in the official matches, which resulted in their removal. The Hungarian Football Federation even tried out foreign coaches: both Lothar Matthäus and Erwin Koeman failed to qualify for any tournaments.

Resurgence

2010s

The Hungary national under-20 team head coach Sándor Egervári was appointed as head coach for the senior side ahead of Euro 2012 qualifying in which Hungary were drawn against Finland, Moldova, the Netherlands, San Marino and Sweden. Hungary won six, drew one and lost three games as they finished the group in third place with 19 points. During the qualification process, in September 2011, Hungary reached the 27th place in the FIFA World Ranking, their highest position to date. At the end of the year, the national team played Liechtenstein as a commemoration of the recently deceased Flórián Albert, the only Hungarian football player to win the Ballon d'Or.

Hungary were drawn in Group D in their 2014 World Cup qualifying, along with the Netherlands, Turkey, Romania, Estonia and Andorra. They amassed 14 points entering the penultimate round of games, but suffered a joint national record defeat 8–1 to the Netherlands, which resulted in the resignation of head coach Sándor Egervári. For their final group game, a 2–0 win against Andorra, Hungary were led by caretaker manager József Csábi. They finished in third place in the group, on 17 points, missing out on qualification. After the match, striker Ádám Szalai gave a press conference delivering a poignant scathing monologue about his perception of "continuously lying to our supporters" when it came to suggesting that the team had a chance against current leading teams of the world. Similar sentiments have been expressed before by midfielder Szabolcs Huszti. During this period, a film crew began filming the team during both their preparations and matches; the film, Még 50 perc was eventually released in 2016 just before Euro 2016.

Attila Pintér was appointed as head coach of the national team in December 2013. Some had seen this decision as controversial, given Pintér's low popularity with fans and players alike. The team played their first game at the newly constructed Groupama Arena on 7 September 2014, a 2–1 defeat to Northern Ireland in Euro 2016 qualifying. Pintér was subsequently dismissed, with Pál Dárdai appointed as a temporary replacement for three matches. He turned down an offer to manage the team on a permanent basis, but was kept on. Subsequently, Dardai was at Hertha BSC, where he had been passing youth coach, was promoted to manager of the first team, but he remained still coach. In the summer of 2015, he resigned as coach of the Hungarian national team to devote himself to his work as Hertha manager. He was eventually replaced by the German sports director of the Hungarian Football Association, Bernd Storck, in July 2015. Storck exercised incidentally continue from the post of Sports Director of the Association.

On 15 November 2015, a Storck-led Hungary qualified for its first European Championship (UEFA Euro 2016) after 44 years, when Hungary was qualified for the 1972 tournament. Hungary beat Norway in the first leg of the qualifying playoffs 1–0; the only goal was scored by László Kleinheisler. On the return match, Hungary beat Norway 2–1 and qualified for the Euro 2016 finals. After beating Austria 2–0 and drawing with Iceland, Hungary played an exciting 3–3 draw against eventual Euro winners Portugal. Hereupon, Hungary managed to qualify for the round of 16 with a game to spare, marking their best Euro or World Cup performance in over 40 years.

Hungary failed to qualify for the 2018 FIFA World Cup in Russia after finishing outside of the qualification places.  Along the way, they drew against the Faroe Islands and were humiliated after being defeated by Andorra 1–0.  After failing to qualify, manager Bernd Storck resigned.
On 10 November 2017, Hungary was embarrassed again when they were defeated by Luxembourg 2–1 in a friendly.
On 30 October 2017, Georges Leekens was appointed as a new head coach. Hungary lost both matches in March 2018, the first defeat was another embarrassing one against minnows Kazakhstan (2–3).

On 19 June 2018, after three losses and one draw under his reign, Leekens was let go and Marco Rossi was appointed in his place.

2018–19 UEFA Nations League C saw Hungary drawn with Finland, Greece and Estonia. Hungary had a nearly successful performance, but losses to Finland and Greece screwed their hope to finish in the top of the group. However, UEFA revised the formula aftermath, meaning Hungary was officially promoted to 2020–21 UEFA Nations League B, having finished second before.

The UEFA Euro 2020 qualifying drew a mixed result for the Hungarians. Grouped in group E, they faced Croatia, Wales, Slovakia and Azerbaijan; the former occupied the silver medal in the 2018 FIFA World Cup while the latter was one of 12 host countries in the tournament. Hungary performed successfully against Croatia and Wales at home, obtaining needed victories, as well as successive wins over Azerbaijan. However, two straight defeats to Slovakia and away losses to Croatia and Wales, with the final loss happened when Hungary had a chance to qualify directly, sent Hungary into a disappointing fourth-place finish at the expense of the Welsh who qualified directly instead. However, Hungary was able to obtain a play-off spot, thanked for finishing second in their group at the Nations League, behind Finland, and was scheduled against Bulgaria.

2020s

While Hungary could only gain a play-off spot in hope to reach the UEFA Euro 2020, Hungary's strong result in previous Nations League gathered more optimism. Hungary began their quest in 2020–21 UEFA Nations League B sharing a group with Russia, Turkey and Serbia. Hungary impressed in their 1–0 victory against host Turkey, Dominik Szoboszlai scoring the game's only goal with a 30-meter free kick. However, Hungary faced a setback when Russia, who Hungary had failed to win against since 1978, beat them at home with 2–3. A series of good results followed later, with two draws against Russia and Serbia, an important away win over the Serbs in Belgrade, and more importantly, a much needed 2–0 win over Turkey at home. This meant that Hungary was able to gain promotion at the expense of Russia to the 2022–23 UEFA Nations League A.

In October 2020, Hungary participated in the play-offs to qualify for UEFA Euro 2020, where they faced Bulgaria in their first game of the play-off series. Despite making an away trip to Sofia, Hungary shone with a 3–1 win to reach the final of the play-off to face Iceland a month later, behind closed doors. The team qualified for the tournament winning 2–1, with last-minute strikes from Loïc Nego and Dominik Szoboszlai to take Hungary into the competition despite an earlier mistake by Péter Gulácsi.

In 2021, Hungary was drawn in the "group of death" of the tournament. Group F featured Portugal, the defending European champions, France, the world champions, and Germany, the 2014 world champions. The Hungarians fought against the odds and put on a heroic performance. The first match in Group F was against Portugal on 15 June in the Puskás Aréna in Budapest. The team held onto a 0–0 draw until the 84th minute, even scoring a goal which was disallowed because scorer Schön was offside. The Hungarians lost focus and the match ended in a 3–0 win for Portugal 

The second game was played on 19 June against France. Fiola took the lead in the second minute of extra time in the first half. Griezmann later equalized and the match ended 1–1, a fantastic result for the small country. The last group game was played on 23 June in Munich, in the Allianz Arena. Still having a chance to qualify, the Hungarians were fired up. They took the lead twice, but the match ultimately ended in a 2–2 draw. Hungary exited the tournament, and Germany saved themselves from another group-stage exit after the 2018 FIFA World Cup.

2022 again brought the "group of death" for Hungary, as during the 2022–23 UEFA Nations League the team had to face off three former world champions in group A3, Italy, Germany, and England respectively. While prior the matches the team was widely considered to be a key contestant for relegation, the Red-White-Greens quickly proved their worth when they beat last year's UEFA Euro silver medalist England 1–0 with a Dominik Szoboszlai penalty an hour into the match. After the victory, expectations were cooled with a 2–1 defeat against Italy in Cesena, nevertheless, an early Zsolt Nagy goal that could only be equalized by Jonas Hofmann resulted in a 1–1 draw against Germany, placing the team second in the group behind Italy. On 14 June, Hungary visited England in Wolverhampton, achieving a stunning 0–4 victory against Gareth Southgate's squad, taking the group's lead after Italy's defeat to Germany. For the last two match days, Hungary's only chance for relegation were defeats against Germany and Italy, with England winning both of their games. The team was taking no chances though, as Ádám Szalai, the long-time forward who announced his retirement a day before the match, scored a heeler to win the game against Germany 1–0 in Leipzig. On 26 September, Hungary only needed a draw to qualify for the UEFA Nations League Finals, however they lost to Italy 2–0 in the Puskás Aréna.

Team image

Rivalry

Hungary has a long-standing rivalry with its neighbours Romania. The rivalry between the two nations dates back from the Treaty of Trianon, where Hungary lost Transylvania to Romania, after World War I. They throw flares and matches between the two sides usually end in a fight between Hungarian and Romanian supporters, however, recently also before the matches conflicts have emerged outside the stadium. These was seen as they shared the same group in 1982 FIFA World Cup qualifying (The other teams of the group were England, Switzerland and Norway), UEFA Euro 2000 qualifying (The other teams of the group were Portugal, Slovakia, Azerbaijan and Liechtenstein), 2002 World Cup qualifying (The other teams of the group were Italy, Georgia and Lithuania), 2014 World Cup qualifying (The other teams of the group were Netherlands, Turkey, Estonia and Andorra) and UEFA Euro 2016 qualifying (The other teams of the group were Greece, Northern Ireland, Finland and Faroe Islands).

The match-up between Austria and Hungary is the second most-played international in football (only Argentina–Uruguay met each other in more matches), although the two teams have only met each other three times since 2000.

Supporters

The Carpathian Brigade is an official supporters' group for the Hungary national football team. The first organized debut of this group was at a Hungary vs. Malta 2010 FIFA World Cup qualification match on 1 April 2009 at Ferenc Puskás Stadium.

Heavy support for the Hungarian national team also comes from Transylvania, Slovakia, Vojvodina, Zakarpattia and Western Europe.

Kits and crest

Hungary's traditional home colours are cherry red shirts, white shorts and green socks. The combination of the colours represent the Hungarian flag. However, the team sometimes wears all white kit even at home. The coat of arms are worn on the left side of the shirt, where the human heart can be found. When the Hungarian players listen to the national anthem of Hungary, "Himnusz", they usually put their arms on to their chest. The actual coat of arms could have always been found on the shirt of the national team in contrast with many other national teams which wear the logo of the football federation. Adidas is currently the designer of the Hungary kits.

Kit suppliers

Home stadium

The home stadium of the Hungarian national side was the Ferenc Puskás Stadium (also called the Népstadion). The stadium was built between 1948 and 1953 using a large number of volunteers, including soldiers. The stadium was opened in 1953. On 23 May 1954, England lost to 7–1 against the Hungarian national team. The capacity of the stadium at the end was 35,100 (approved by the UEFA) though its original capacity exceeded the 100,000. The stadium also hosted one of the Derbies of Budapest, including Ferencváros, Újpest, MTK, Honvéd or Vasas. The national teams's final match played at the stadium resulted in 3–0 win for Hungary against Kazakhstan on 7 June 2014.

On 19 September 2014, UEFA selected Budapest to host three group stage games and one round of 16 game at UEFA Euro 2020.
 On 19 September 2014, Sándor Csányi, the president of the Hungarian Football Federation, said that the fact that Budapest can host UEFA Euro 2020 is a big achievement of the Hungarian sport diplomacy.

On 15 November 2019 the arena was opened by the match Hungary-Uruguay. The idea to invite the Uruguay national football team came from 
Károly Jankovics who is the leader of the Hungarian community in Montevideo. All of the tickets were sold for the opening match against Uruguay. In the first three days only the members of the Supporters' Club of the Hungarian Football Federation could purchase the tickets.

On 10 August 2014, Ferencváros' Groupama Arena was opened which was the temporary home of the national team between 2014 and 2019 during the EURO 20016 qualification, 2018 World Cup qualification  and Euro 2020 qualification.

Recent results and forthcoming fixtures

2022

2023

Coaching staff

Players

Current squad
The following 25 players were called up for the international friendly match against Estonia and the UEFA Euro 2024 qualifying match against Bulgaria on 23 and 27 March 2023 respectively.

Caps and goals updated as of 20 November 2022, after the match against Greece.

Recent call-ups
The following players have been selected by Hungary in the past 12 months.

INJ Injured player.
PRE Preliminary squad.
RET Retired from international football.
SUS Suspended for the next match.
WD Withdrew from the squad due to non-injury issue.
QUA Placed in quarantine after a contact with COVID-19.

Player records

Players in bold are still active with Hungary.

Most appearances

Most goals

Captains

Notable players 
Goalkeepers

Defenders

Midfielders

Forwards

Competitive record

FIFA World Cup

 Champions   Runners-up   Third place   Fourth place

UEFA European Championship

 Champions   Runners-up   Third place   Fourth place

UEFA Nations League

Summer Olympics

The first 3 Olympic football events were only unofficial tournaments, with a few nations represented by a club team. Starting from 1908, the Olympic football tournament became an official event, with representation of the official national football teams.

After the Olympics 1988, the football event was changed into a tournament with participation only for the Under-23 national teams.

 Gold medalists    Silver medalists    Bronze medalists

Team records

The match between Austria and Hungary in Vienna in 1902 was the first international match played between two non-British European countries.

Hungary was the first team from outside the United Kingdom and Ireland to beat England at home, famously winning 6–3 at Wembley on 25 November 1953. Six months later they beat England 7–1 in 1954, this time in Budapest. This still ranks as England's record defeat.

The trainer responsible for gelling together the elements of the Hungarian side on the 1950s, Gusztáv Sebes holds the highest ratio of victories per game past 30 matches with 72.06% (49 wins, 12, draws, 7 defeats). Brazil great Vicente Feola (1955–1966) owns the second highest with 71.88% (46 wins, 12 draws, 6 defeats).

Hungary owns the records for quality in offensive throughput in a single World Cup finals competition. Football historians often relate to the 27 goals (5.4 gls / game) and a goal differential of +17 as records likely never to be passed in the more preventive modern game.
Sándor Kocsis, along with his record 7 hat tricks in the international game, owns the single World Cup finals competition's record with 2.2 goals/match. In 1953, they also became Central European Champions

Hungary has the distinction of setting the highest Elo football rating ever achieved by a national side, a high of 2230 in 1954. It was set after Hungary's 4–2 victory over Uruguay in the 1954 World Cup semi-final on 30 June 1954, the final match in their 31-game unbeaten streak (see below). Germany and England come in second (2223 in 2014) and third (2212 in 1928) respectively. Brazil of 1962 owns the fourth highest with 2194, and Spain of 2010, with 2165, is the fifth.

Ferenc Puskás was recognized to be the top scorer of the 20th century, by the IFFHS.

Top international goalscorers of the 20th century

Two of the top six international goalscorers of the 20th century were Hungarian, both of them from the Golden Team of the 1950s.

Undefeated run
Hungary, with its master narrative of being undefeated in the 1950s also broke one of football's timeless benchmarks being first to eclipse an 1888 Scotland national football team record of being undefeated in 22 consecutive matches. They bettered the old mark by nine additional games to 31 (or 32 counting the match against East Germany, that is not considered an official international for that team). Hungary holds the third longest consecutive run of matches unbeaten with 31 international games between 14 May 1950 and 4 July 1954, when they lost the World Cup final to West Germany.

Italy hold the longest string of 37 unbeaten matches.

* = not official

All-time team record

The following table shows Hungary's all-time international record, correct as of 20 November 2022.

Head-to-head record

The following table shows Hungary's all-time international record, correct as of 20 November 2022.

FIFA ranking
Last updated on 7 June 2022

Notes
Note 1: from January 1999 the FIFA changed the system of the ranking calculation
Note 2: from July 2006 the FIFA changed the system of the ranking calculation
Note 3: from August 2018 the FIFA changed the system of the ranking calculation

Honours

International titles
 FIFA World Cup
  Runners-up (2): 1938, 1954

 UEFA European Championship
  Third place (1): 1964

 Olympic Games
  Gold medal (3): 1952, 1964, 1968
  Silver medal (1): 1972
  Bronze medal (1): 1960

 Balkan Cup
  Champions (1): 1947

See also

Austria–Hungary football rivalry
Hungary men's national under-17 football team
Hungary men's national under-19 football team
Hungary men's national under-21 football team
Hungary-Romania football rivalry
Hungary women's national football team

Notes

References

External links

Hungarian Football Federation
Hungary at FIFA 
Hungary at UEFA
Tickets related to the Hungarian National Football Team (En/Hun)
Old crests of the Hungarian National Football Team (En/Hun)
Every Olympic match with theHungarian National Football Team (En/Hun)
National Team (some statistics) (Hun)
RSSSF archive of results 1902–
RSSSF archive of most capped players and highest goalscorers
RSSSF archive of coaches 1902–
IFFHS Archive: 1902–1910
Hungary in World Cups/Planet World cup/
Aranycsapat – 'The Golden Team' (Hun)
sportmuzeum
Hungarian goals (Magyar Gólok)

 
European national association football teams